Edmundas Benetis  (born 12 August 1953, Palanga) is a Lithuanian architect.

References

Lithuanian architects
1953 births
Living people
Vilnius Gediminas Technical University alumni
People from Palanga